Antioch is a small unincorporated community  in Clarke County, Alabama, United States, located south of Grove Hill along US Highway 43. It has several small churches and a fire department.

Demographics
According to the returns from 1850-2010 for Alabama, it has never reported a population figure separately on the U.S. Census.

References 

Unincorporated communities in Clarke County, Alabama
Unincorporated communities in Alabama